Fairview–Pointe-Claire is a Réseau express métropolitain (REM) station under construction in Pointe-Claire, Quebec, Canada. It is planned to be operated by CDPQ Infra and serves as a station of the Anse-à-l'Orme branch of the REM, with an expected opening in the second quarter of 2024.

It could promote the implementation of a transit-oriented development (TOD). However, the station is being built in the parking lot of the eponymous Fairview Pointe-Claire shopping mall where there very little nearby residential housing, at a time of critical housing shortage.  A TOD maximizes the amount of space within walking distance of public transport. It promotes sustainable urbanization by reducing the use of private cars.

Cadillac Fairview is proposing to replace 900 parking spots with hundreds of residential units, a seniors' home, and open public areas. As of the second quarter of 2022 the project has been "frozen" by Pointe-Claire city council. The mayor, elected in the 2021 Quebec municipal elections, campaigned on a platform of opposing development.

References

Railway stations in Montreal
Réseau express métropolitain railway stations
Transport in Pointe-Claire
Buildings and structures in Pointe-Claire
Railway stations scheduled to open in 2024